Caranda Airport  is an airstrip serving Caranda in the Santa Cruz Department of Bolivia. The runway is just north of the village.

See also

Transport in Bolivia
List of airports in Bolivia

References

External links 
OpenStreetMap - Caranda
OurAirports - Caranda
Fallingrain - Caranda Airport
HERE/Nokia - Caranda

Airports in Santa Cruz Department (Bolivia)